Rhona Brankin (born 19 January 1950) is a former Scottish Labour-Co-operative politician who served as the Member of the Scottish Parliament (MSP) for the Midlothian constituency. She was first elected in 1999 and was re-elected in 2003 and 2007. She was one of six female Labour MSPs to stand down in 2011.

Background
Brankin is a graduate of the University of Aberdeen and before entering the Scottish Parliament she was a teacher and a lecturer on special educational needs. She was former Chair of the Scottish Labour Party. She is married with two grown-up daughters.

In early 2000, Brankin was diagnosed with breast cancer. She had a mastectomy at St. John's Hospital in Livingston, which successfully removed the cancer.

Scottish Parliament
Brankin was Deputy Minister for Culture and Sport in the Scottish Executive from 1999–2000 and Deputy Minister for Environment and Rural Development from 2000–2001. In October 2004 she was appointed Deputy Minister for Health and Community care, returning to the Environment and Rural Development portfolio in June 2005. In January 2007 she was promoted to Minister for Communities after the resignation of Malcolm Chisholm. Following Labour's defeat at the hands of the SNP at the May 2007 election, Brankin became shadow Minister for Education and Lifelong Learning. She was convener of the Public Petitions Committee from June 2010.

Prior to the 2011 elections, Brankin announced her decision not to stand for re-election, retiring from Holyrood after 12 years. The Midlothian constituency underwent boundary changes, and the two new constituencies created, Midlothian North and Musselburgh, and Midlothian South, Tweeddale and Lauderdale, were won by the SNP.

References

External links 

 

1950 births
Living people
Alumni of the University of Aberdeen
Labour Co-operative MSPs
Members of the Scottish Parliament 1999–2003
Members of the Scottish Parliament 2003–2007
Members of the Scottish Parliament 2007–2011
Ministers of the Scottish Government
Women members of the Scottish Government
20th-century Scottish women politicians